This page describes the shipping services of the Glasgow and South Western Railway.

Background
The Glasgow and South Western Railway operated a network of railways in the south-west quadrant of Scotland, and in time developed a series of associated piers and shipping routes, chiefly in the Firth of Clyde.

Passenger ships
The G&SWR ran a fleet of passenger steamships on scheduled and excursion services from its various piers and harbours. In 1872 the Greenock and Ayrshire Railway Co bought the second-hand paddle steamer , dating from 1868. In 1891, the G&SWR took her over and bought five more second-hand steamers.

In 1901 the Parsons Marine Steam Turbine Company, shipbuilder William Denny and Brothers and passenger steamer operator Captain John Williamson formed the Turbine Steamer Syndicate. The G&SWR supported Williamson by guaranteeing his overdraft. The syndicate introduced
the World's first turbine steamer, TS King Edward, which was launched that year. Denny built her, Parsons supplied her machinery and Williamson operated her on the River Clyde and Firth of Clyde. Despite this early involvement, it was not until 1906 that the G&SWR got a turbine steamer of its own, TS Atalanta, launched that year by John Brown and Company. After that the G&SWR sold Viceroy in 1907 and sold Vulcan back to her previous owner in 1908.

In the First World War, paddle steamers were found suitable for service as auxiliary minesweepers so the Admiralty requisitioned most of the G&SWR's fleet for war service. The steamers' names were changed because the Royal Navy already had warships bearing many of their original names. In 1917 two were lost on active service. In April Neptune, serving as HMS Nepaulin, was sunk by a mine and in November Mars, serving as HMS Marsa, sank as a result of a collision off Harwich. Minerva survived the war but did not return to the G&SWR. She remained with the Admiralty until April 1920 and was sold to new owners in Turkey in 1924.

References

Glasgow and South Western Railway
Rail transport in Scotland